Averroes wrote a medical encyclopedia called Kulliyat ("Generalities", i. e. general medicine), known in its Latin translation as Colliget.

References

External links

Encyclopedias of medicine
12th-century Arabic books
Medical works of the medieval Islamic world
Literature of the Almohad Caliphate
1160s books